The Tstsikamma Marine Protected Area is a marine protected area on the south coast of South Africa, in both the Western Cape and Eastern Cape. It is on the coast of the Tsitsikamma National Park, and is one of the oldest MPAs in the country. The MPA provides protection for marine habitat and wildlife, including birds and threatened and endangered fish species. 

The MPA is in near pristine condition, and is a suitable area for research on endangered fish species. It was designated as a Marine Protected Area in 1964. The length of the protected shoreline is 60 km, and the area of protected ocean is 186 km2. 

The MPA is managed by SANParks.

History
The MPA was proclaimed by the Minister of Environmental Affairs and Tourism, Mohammed Valli Moosa, in Government Gazette No. 21948 of 29 December 2000 in terms section 43 of the Marine Natural Resources Act, 18 of 1998.

Purpose

A marine protected area is defined by the IUCN as "A clearly defined geographical space, recognised, dedicated and managed, through legal or other effective means, to achieve the long-term conservation of nature with associated ecosystem services and cultural values".

Extent
The length of the protected shoreline is 60 km, and the area of protected ocean is 186 km2.

Zonation
The entire MPA is zoned as a restricted (no-take) area.

Boundaries

Northern boundary is the high-water mark between Die Punt, Nature's Valley, at S33°59.0' E023°34.561' (west), and the right bank of the Grootrivier at S34°03.6', E024°11.665, (east)
Eastern boundary is a line from the right bank of the Grootrivier at S34°03.6', E024°11.665, running due south to a point three nautical  miles offshore at S34°06.6', E024°11.665
Southern boundary is a straight line from S34°06.6', E024°11.665, approximately parallel to the shore, to a point three nautical miles from the high-water mark at S34°01.817', E023°38.857E measured along a line running due south from the right bank of the mouth of the Bloukrans River, and then due north to a point 0.5 nautical miles from the high-water mark at S33°59.317', E023°38.857', and then along a straight line roughly parallel to the shoreline to a point at S33°59.5', E023°34.561' due south of Die Punt, Nature's Valley.
The western boundary is a line from the high-water mark at Die Punt, Natures  Valley, at S33°59.0' E023°34.561' due south to a point about 0.5 nautical miles offshore at S33°59.5', E023°34.561' The northern boundary of the MPA is the southern boundary of the Tsitsikamma National Park

Restricted areas
The whole MPA is a restricted zone.

Management
The marine protected areas of South Africa are the responsibility of the national government, which has management  agreements with a variety of MPA management authorities, in this case, South African National Parks (SANParks), which manages the MPA with funding from the SA Government through the Department of Environmental Affairs (DEA).

The Department of Agriculture, Forestry and Fisheries is responsible for issuing permits, quotas and law enforcement.

Use

Activities requiring a permit

Scuba diving

A permit is required to scuba dive in any MPA in South Africa. These permits are valid for a year and are available at some branches of the Post Office. Temporary permits, valid for a month, may be available at dive shops or from dive boat operators who operate in an MPA. A personal recreational scuba diving permit is valid in all South African MPAs where recreational diving is allowed. The business permit to operate recreational scuba business operations in an MPA is restricted to a specific MPA. Diving for commercial or scientific purposes is also subject to permit. There is an office at the Storms River mouth slipway where dives can be organised.

Named dive sites 

The MPA has several rocky reef recreational dive sites which have been identified by position and named. Some of these have been described in the travel guide for diving the Tsitsikamma on Wikivoyage. Some of them are listed here:

 Storm's River Mouth, 
 The Knoll, just off the cliffs east of the Storms River mouth 
 Rheeders' Reef, 
 Middle Bank, offshore from Storms River mouth

Prohibited activities

Geography

General topography
The coastline is fairly straight, and is generally very steep from a relatively flat coastal region between the inland mountains and the sea. Much of the shoreline can best be described as cliffs. The Storms River gorge is roughly perpendicular to the coastline, and very narrow — the sides are approximately vertical. A boat trip or hike up the gorge will show a section through the coastal formations.

Geology
The rock formations are heavily folded sandstones and shales of the Table Mountain series. The coastline formation to the west of the river mouth is the Silurian Tchando formation, which is typically fine to coarse grained brown sandstone and shale, and inland and across the river to the east, mostly Ordovician Peninsula sandstone. Offshore formations may include Devonian Gydo shales and siltstones. Folding is roughly parallel to the coastline, and dip is frequently near vertical, even overfolded in places. Resistance to weathering is also very variable, with some extremely resistant quartzitic sandstone, and some very friable shales. As a result, there are areas with distinct ridges, often roughly parallel to the shoreline.

Hydrography

Bathymetry

Climate of the southern Cape

Seasonal variations in sea conditions

Ecology

 
The MPA is in the warm temperate Agulhas inshore marine bioregion to the east of Cape Point which extends eastwards to the Mbashe River. The Mbashe River was chosen as the most appropriate boundary between the subtropical Natal province to the north, and the warm temperate Agulhas region to the south, but change is gradual between these regions. Upwelling on the south coast of South Africa is largely driven by the Agulhas current and the continental shelf. This form of upwelling forces cold deep water up onto the continental shelf, but not necessarily above the thermocline. In the region east of the Agulhas bank, wind enhanced upwelling, occurring mainly in summer, augments the current driven upwelling bringing the colder deeper waters to the surface. This enhances biological productivity by supply of nutrients to the euphotic zone (where plants have sufficient light to flourish) which fuels phytoplankton production, and rocky shores that are supplied with the nutrient rich water support rich algal biomass. There are a large proportion of species endemic to South Africa along this coastline.

Three major habitats exist in the sea in this region, distinguished by the nature of the substrate. The substrate, or base material, is important in that it provides a base to which an organism can anchor itself, which is vitally important for those organisms which need to stay in one particular kind of place. Rocky shores and reefs provide a firm fixed substrate for the attachment of plants and animals. Sandy beaches and bottoms are a relatively unstable substrate and cannot anchor kelp or many of the other benthic organisms. Finally there is open water, above the substrate and clear of the kelp forest, where the organisms must drift or swim. Mixed habitats are also frequently found, which are a combination of those mentioned above. There are no significant estuarine habitats in the MPA.

Rocky shores and reefs
There are rocky reefs and mixed rocky and sandy bottoms. For many marine organisms the substrate is another type of marine organism, and it is common for several layers to co-exist. Examples of this are red bait pods, which are usually encrusted with sponges, ascidians, bryozoans, anemones, and gastropods, and abalone, which are usually covered by similar seaweeds to those found on the surrounding rocks, usually with a variety of other organisms living on the seaweeds.

The type of rock of the reef is of some importance, as it influences the range of possibilities for the local topography, which in turn influences the range of habitats provided, and therefore the diversity of inhabitants. Sandstone and other sedimentary rocks erode and weather very differently, and depending on the direction of dip and strike, and steepness of the dip, may produce reefs which are relatively flat to very high profile and full of small crevices. These features may be at varying angles to the shoreline and wave fronts. There are fewer large holes, tunnels and crevices in sandstone reefs, but often many deep but low near-horizontal crevices.

Sandy beaches and bottoms (including shelly, pebble and gravel bottoms)
Sandy bottoms at first glance appear to be fairly barren areas, as they lack the stability to support many of the spectacular reef based species, and the variety of large organisms is relatively low. The sand is continually being moved around by wave action, to a greater or lesser degree depending on weather conditions and exposure of the area. This means that sessile organisms must be specifically adapted to areas of relatively loose substrate to thrive in them, and the variety of species found on a sandy or gravel bottom will depend on all these factors. Sandy bottoms have one important compensation for their instability, animals can burrow into the sand and move up and down within its layers, which can provide feeding opportunities and protection from predation. Other species can dig themselves holes in which to shelter, or may feed by filtering water drawn through the tunnel, or by extending body parts adapted to this function into the water above the sand.

The open sea

Marine species diversity

Animals

Seaweeds

Endemism
The MPA is in the warm temperate Agulhas inshore marine bioregion to the east of Cape Point which extends eastwards to the Mbashe River. There are a large proportion of species endemic to South Africa along this coastline.

Alien invasive species

Threats

Slipways and harbours in the MPA
There is a small concrete slipway at the Storm's River Mouth, which is moderately protected from swell. The Storms River mouth is navigable for small craft for some distance, and there are places where a boat can moor in the gorge that are accessible by footpath from the mouth.

See also

References

Marine protected areas of South Africa
Underwater diving sites in South Africa